Sheykh Zaharav (also Romanized as Sheykh Zaharāv) is a village in Karkheh Rural District, Hamidiyeh District, Ahvaz County, Khuzestan Province, Iran. During the 2006 census, its population was 1,960, in 302 families.

References 

Populated places in Ahvaz County